Japanese Singles Collection -Greatest Hits- is the fourth greatest hits album by American singer Janet Jackson. It was released on August 24, 2022, in Japan by Universal Music Group as a part of the Japanese Singles Collection album series. The double-disc album features 38 of Jackson's singles released over the previous 40 years, as well as a DVD containing 44 of Jackson's music videos. Its release was timed to commemorate the fortieth anniversary of the release of Jackson's debut album. 

The collection spans Jackson's full career, collecting singles from her first album Janet Jackson (1982) to her eighth studio album Damita Jo (2004). The accompanying DVD features music videos from Jackson's second album Dream Street (1984) through her second greatest hits album Number Ones (2009), including seven of Jackson's music videos on DVD for the first time. The collection also includes "Start Anew", a single previously only released on the first Japanese pressing of Jackson's third album, Control.

Track listings 

Notes
 denotes first time release on DVD

Charts

References 

2022 greatest hits albums
Janet Jackson compilation albums
Universal Music Group compilation albums